Vadim Cobîlaş (born 30 July 1983) is a Moldovan professional rugby union player who plays as a tighthead prop for French Top 14 club Bordeaux Bègles and the Moldova national team.

Career
He played for Russian side VVA-Podmoskovye Monino before signing for Sale Sharks in the Aviva Premiership in England on 2 March 2011. He is the first Moldovan rugby player to become a professional in England.

In 2016, Cobîlaş joined Bordeaux Bègles in the French Top 14.

International career
Cobîlaş plays internationally for Moldova.

Personal life
Vadim has a younger brother who also plays rugby called Maxim Cobîlaș who plays for VVA Podmoskovye.

References

External links

1983 births
Living people
People from Soroca
Moldovan rugby union players
Sale Sharks players
Rugby union props
Union Bordeaux Bègles players
Moldovan expatriate rugby union players
Expatriate rugby union players in England
Expatriate rugby union players in Russia
Moldovan expatriate sportspeople in England
Moldovan expatriate sportspeople in Russia
Moldovan expatriate sportspeople in France
Expatriate rugby union players in France